Platynectes is a genus of beetles in the family Dytiscidae, containing the following species:

 Platynectes aenescens Sharp, 1882
 Platynectes ambonensis Hendrich & Balke, 2000
 Platynectes australicus Guéorguiev, 1972
 Platynectes babai Satô, 1982
 Platynectes bakewelli (Clark, 1863)
 Platynectes beroni Guéorguiev, 1978
 Platynectes brownei Guéorguiev, 1972
 Platynectes buruensis Zimmermann, 1925
 Platynectes chapmani Guéorguiev, 1978
 Platynectes chujoi Satô, 1982
 Platynectes darlingtoni Guéorguiev, 1972
 Platynectes decastigma Régimbart, 1899
 Platynectes decemnotatus (Aubé, 1838)
 Platynectes decempunctatus (Fabricius, 1775)
 Platynectes deletus Régimbart, 1899
 Platynectes dissimilis (Sharp, 1873)
 Platynectes gemellatus Stastný, 2003
 Platynectes gigas Hendrich & Balke, 2000
 Platynectes hainanensis Nilsson, 1998
 Platynectes jaechi Hendrich & Balke, 2000
 Platynectes javanus Nilsson, 1998
 Platynectes kashmiranus J.Balfour-Browne, 1944
 Platynectes laurianus Watts, 1978
 Platynectes magellanicus (Babington, 1841)
 Platynectes major Nilsson, 1998
 Platynectes manusela Hendrich & Balke, 2000
 Platynectes mazzoldii Stastný, 2003
 Platynectes moluccensis Hendrich & Balke, 2000
 Platynectes monostigma (Hope, 1841)
 Platynectes nanlingensis Stastný, 2003
 Platynectes neoguineensis Guéorguiev & Rocchi, 1993
 Platynectes nigerrimus (Aubé, 1838)
 Platynectes octodecimmaculatus (W.S.Macleay, 1825)
 Platynectes ornatifrons Sharp, 1882
 Platynectes parananus Sharp, 1882
 Platynectes ranongensis Nilsson, 1998
 Platynectes reticulosus (Clark, 1863)
 Platynectes rihai Stastný, 2003
 Platynectes rodriguezi Severin, 1890
 Platynectes semperi Régimbart, 1899
 Platynectes submaculatus (Laporte, 1835)
 Platynectes tasmaniae (Clark, 1863)
 Platynectes undecimguttatus (Aubé, 1838)
 Platynectes wewalkai Stastný, 2003

References

Dytiscidae